Joshua Kenneth Mballa (born 29 July 1999) is a French college basketball player for the Ole Miss Rebels of the Southeastern Conference (SEC). He previously played for the Texas Tech Red Raiders and Buffalo Bulls.

Early life and career
Mballa was born in Detroit, Michigan but raised in Bordeaux, France. He started playing competitive basketball at age eight, learning from Vincent Mbassi, a trainer at Kameet Academy who knew his uncle. He played for Bouscat and then JSA Bordeaux before joining Orléans Loiret. Mballa returned to the United States for high school, attending Putnam Science Academy in Putnam, Connecticut. Playing alongside Kyle Lofton and Osun Osunniyi, he helped his team win the National Prep Championship. A three-star recruit, he committed to playing college basketball for Texas Tech over offers from Seton Hall and South Florida.

College career
As a freshman at Texas Tech, Mballa played sparingly, scoring 13 total points, and his team reached the national championship game. For his sophomore season, he transferred to Buffalo and received a waiver for immediate eligibility. As a sophomore, Mballa averaged 10.8 points and 9.6 rebounds per game. He grabbed 308 rebounds, the most by a Buffalo player in a single season since Sam Pellom in the 1975–76 season. He missed three games early in his junior season due to plantar fasciitis. On 19 December 2020, Mballa posted a career-high 27 points and seven rebounds in a 107–96 overtime loss to Syracuse. As a junior, he averaged 15.3 points and 10.8 rebounds per game, receiving Second Team All-Mid-American Conference (MAC) and Defensive Player of the Year honors. He declared for the 2021 NBA draft before withdrawing and returning to Buffalo. Mballa was named to the Second Team All-MAC as a senior. Following the season, Mballa declared for the 2022 NBA draft while maintaining his college eligibility. He also later entered the transfer portal. On May 15, 2022, Mballa announced he was transferring to Ole Miss. He subsequently withdrew from the NBA Draft.

National team career
Mballa represented France at the 2016 FIBA Under-17 World Championship in Spain, where he averaged 4.2 points and four rebounds per game. At the 2017 FIBA U18 European Championship in Slovakia, he averaged 7.4 points and 4.9 rebounds per game.

Career statistics

College

|-
| style="text-align:left;"| 2018–19
| style="text-align:left;"| Texas Tech
| 17 || 0 || 3.4 || .444 || .000 || .357 || .3 || .1 || .1 || .1 || .8
|-
| style="text-align:left;"| 2019–20
| style="text-align:left;"| Buffalo
| 32 || 20 || 25.8 || .562 || .000 || .590 || 9.6 || 1.0 || 1.3 || 1.1 || 10.8
|-
| style="text-align:left;"| 2020–21
| style="text-align:left;"| Buffalo
| 22 || 19 || 29.5 || .486 || .250 || .679 || 10.8 || 1.9 || 1.5 || .5 || 15.3
|- class="sortbottom"
| style="text-align:center;" colspan="2"| Career
| 71 || 39 || 21.6 || .521 || .227 || .618 || 7.7 || 1.0 || 1.1 || .7 || 9.8

References

External links
Buffalo Bulls bio
Texas Tech Red Raiders bio

1999 births
Living people
French men's basketball players
Sportspeople from Bordeaux
Texas Tech Red Raiders basketball players
Buffalo Bulls men's basketball players
Small forwards
Power forwards (basketball)